Lady Caroline Lamb is a 1972 British epic romantic drama film based on the life of Lady Caroline Lamb, novelist, sometime lover of Lord Byron and wife of politician William Lamb, 2nd Viscount Melbourne (later Prime Minister). The only film written and directed by Robert Bolt, it starred his wife, Sarah Miles, as Lady Caroline, Jon Finch, Richard Chamberlain, Laurence Olivier, Ralph Richardson, John Mills, Margaret Leighton and Michael Wilding.

Plot Synopsis
Caroline Ponsonby (Sarah Miles) accepts a marriage proposal from William Lamb (Jon Finch). Despite the misgivings of his mother, the marriage seems happy enough at first, a love match, but on their honeymoon in Italy William becomes concerned about Lady Caroline's wilful behaviour, which leads to a man's death. Back in England William is seen as a political "coming man", respected by parliamentarians both Whig and Tory. Meanwhile Lady Caroline meets the poverty stricken Lord Byron (Richard Chamberlain), and visits his modest flat. To her husband, she claims to find Byron "disturbing" and that she will not see him again. Byron has a sudden success with his long poem, Childe Harold's Pilgrimage, and becomes a wealthy celebrity, feted in society. An early literary superstar, he also becomes an object of fascination among women, some of whom write to him provocative fan letters. Lady Caroline and Byron begin a scandalous affair. Eventually he tires of her, and after she appears with Byron at a Holland House costume ball as a black slave, half naked and covered in greasepaint, she finds herself humiliated and a figure of derision in society. At the ball, Byron becomes interested in another woman, his future wife, Anne Isabella Millbanke (Silvia Monti). Lady Caroline's behaviour becomes more bizarre when, dressed as a coach boy, she stalks Byron to a ceremonial dinner commemorating Wellington's victory against the French. Crashing the gathering, she interrupts Byron and Millbanke, cutting her forearm with a knife. William is taken to meet King George IV, who pressures him to leave Lady Caroline so he can take up the prestigious post of Chief Secretary for Ireland, but William is reluctant to abandon her. Lady Caroline's mental health has deteriorated further but, with the support of her husband, she appears to recover. However, after she understands that her notoriety is undermining her husband's career, her wilfulness returns. She flees to France, where she has a brief affair with Wellington. Spurned by him, she returns to England and prepares a legal separation, with the approval of William's mother. Lady Caroline descends further into despair and illness, dying apparently from a broken heart.

Cast
 Sarah Miles as Lady Caroline Lamb
 Jon Finch as William Lamb
 Richard Chamberlain as Lord Byron
 John Mills as Canning
 Margaret Leighton as Lady Melbourne
 Pamela Brown as Lady Bessborough
 Silvia Monti as Miss Millbanke
 Ralph Richardson as King George IV.
 Laurence Olivier as Duke of Wellington
 Michael Wilding as Lord Holland
 Peter Bull as Minister
 Charles Carson as Potter
 Sonia Dresdel as Lady Pont
 Nicholas Field as St. John
 Trevor Peacock as Boxing Agent
 Norman Mitchell as Waiter
 Bernard Kay as Benson
 Caterina Boratto
 Felicity Gibson as Girl in Blue

Background
The film was the directorial debut of screenwriter Robert Bolt and starred his wife Sarah Miles in the title role. Bolt said he was attracted to the story of Lamb because it "was funny, touching and entertaining" and felt the movie was about "the struggle between the romantics of the world and the classicists.... The classical, ignoble view of life, as espoused by Wellington in the film, keep society going... but it's the romantics, like Caroline, who drive life, who instigate new ideas, and who often are the true geniuses."

Bolt said it was difficult to raise finance because people said they had not heard of Lady Caroline Lamb. In July 1971 it was announced the film, then called Lamb would be the first film financed by Tomorrow Entertainment, a subsidiary of General Electric, in association with Pulsar Productions and Vides Cinematographa of Rome. Richard Chamberlain and Sarah Miles would star, with cameos from Laurence Olivier, Margaret Leighton and John Mills. Filming was to start the following month in England and Rome and Fernando Ghia as producer.

However these plans fell through. Eventually finance was raised from Anglo-EMI and General Electric but Bolt had to waive all his fee in order to keep artistic control.

"I've been playing zanies and eccentrics for the past few years," said Chamberlain, "so Byron is new for me. He was like this incredible pop star."

"I'm not a good director but I know what the author intended," said Bolt.

Bolt did not direct another film. The film is also notable because it is the last film in which Michael Wilding appeared, in a cameo with his last wife, Margaret Leighton, who played Lady Melbourne. The film score was composed by Richard Rodney Bennett, who later based a concert work, Elegy for Lady Caroline Lamb for viola and orchestra, on some of the material.

Reception

Critical
Praise came for Laurence Olivier's cameo as the Duke of Wellington, with Philip French of The Times writing that "... Olivier's brief appearance as the Duke of Wellington is a beautifully witty and rounded characterization that is worth the price of the admission in itself".

The Los Angeles Times called it "beautiful but dumb."

Box Office
The film was one of the most popular movies of 1973 at the British box office. It was nominated for three BAFTA awards.

External links

References 

1972 films
1972 directorial debut films
1972 romantic drama films
1970s biographical drama films
1970s British films
1970s English-language films
1970s historical drama films
British biographical drama films
British historical drama films
British romantic drama films
Cultural depictions of Arthur Wellesley, 1st Duke of Wellington
Cultural depictions of George IV
Cultural depictions of Lord Byron
Films about writers
Films scored by Richard Rodney Bennett
Films set in London
Films set in the 19th century
Films shot at Pinewood Studios
Films with screenplays by Robert Bolt
United Artists films
Works by Robert Bolt